Comedy Central is an Indian pay television channel owned by Viacom18. The channel is geared for mature audiences and carries comedy programming in the form of both original and syndicated series, as well as stand-up comedy specials.

Despite the name, it mainly airs series from Warner Bros. Television while Comedy Central originals are rarely aired. It also continues to use the 2011 logo of Comedy Central.

Programming

Current programming 
 Friends
 The Graham Norton Show
 The Office (US)
 The Middle
 Young Rock

Former programming 

 'Allo 'Allo!
 30 Rock
 3rd Rock from the Sun
 About a Boy
 Alex, Inc.
 America's Funniest Home Videos
 Anger Management
 Angie Tribeca
 A.P. Bio
 Archer
 Are We There Yet?
 Arrested Development
 Awkward
 Betty White's Off Their Rockers
 The Big Bang Theory
 Billy on the Street
 Blunt Talk
 Bob Hearts Abishola
Call Me Fitz
 Brooklyn Nine-Nine
 The Carmichael Show
 Carpoolers
 Challenge Accepted
 Citizen Khan
 Community
 Complete Savages
 Coupling
 Crowded
The Daily Show with Jon Stewart
 Deadbeat
 The Detour
 Dharma & Greg
 Doogie Howser, M.D.
 Dr. Ken
 Episodes
 Everybody Hates Chris
 Everybody Loves Raymond
 The Exes
 Fawlty Towers
 Go On
 The Good Place
 Goodness Gracious Me
 The Great Indoors
 Great News
 Greek
 Growing Up Fisher'''
 Guys with Kids Happily Divorced Hope & Faith Hot in Cleveland House of Lies How Not to Live Your Life I Feel Bad I Survived a Japanese Game Show ImpastorImpractical Jokers The Inbetweeners The IT Crowd The Jim Gaffigan Show Just for Laughs Kevin Can Wait Key & Peele The King of Queens The Kumars at No. 42 Little Britain Live at Gotham M*A*S*H Malcolm in the Middle Man with a Plan Marlon Mike & Molly Mind Your Language The Mindy Project Mulaney Murphy Brown My Boys Nathan For You No Tomorrow Odd Mom Out The Office Outsourced Perfect Couples Playing House Pranked Psych Punk'd Reno 911! Ridiculousness Rules of Engagement Samantha Who? Saturday Night Live Schitt's Creek Scrubs Sean Saves the World Seed Seinfeld Sirens South Park Suburgatory Suits Superior Donuts Superstore Teenage Mutant Ninja Turtles The Middle Telenovela That '70s Show Threesome Ugly Betty Undateable Up All Night Web Therapy Whitney Will & Grace Wipeout The Wonder Years Whose Line Is It Anyway? World's Craziest Fools Wrecked Younger Young Sheldon Your Family or Mine Mom Young Sheldon Future Man The Big Bang Theory Detroiters Takeshi's Castle Penn & Teller: Fool UsHistory
Comedy Central launched in India on 23 January 2012, the product of a joint venture between Viacom and TV18. To promote the then new channel and nudge viewers its way the group organised a live event featuring British comedian Russell Brand who performed in a  three-city tour of New Delhi, Bangalore, and Mumbai, the biggest markets for English programming in India.

The channel was rebranded in 2015 with a new look, exclusively made for the Indian version of Comedy Central and a new slogan.

Broadcast ban
Comedy Central was prohibited from broadcasting in India for 10 days, from 25 May until 4 June 2012, after an inter-ministerial committee (IMC) set up by the Ministry of Information and Broadcasting found that two of its shows that aired in 2012, carried "obscene dialogues and vulgar words" that "offend good taste", violating several provisions of the Cable Television Networks Rules, 1994. The provisions of the law include "no programme should be carried in the cable service which offends against good taste or decency; no programme should be carried which contains anything obscene, defamatory, deliberate, false and suggestive innuendos and half truths". It also states that "no programme should be carried which denigrates women through the depiction in any manner of the figure of woman, her form or body or any part thereof in such a way as to have the effect of being indecent or derogatory to women or is likely to injure the public morality". The incidents in question involved an episode of Stand Up Club where an unnamed stand-up performed an act with "obscene dialogues and vulgar words derogatory to women" aired on 26 May 2012, and an episode of the French hidden camera prank show PopCorn TV aired on 4 July 2012, where one of the crew members was shown standing opposite a wall, in a shop holding a pair of fake legs against his thighs in his hands and making suggestive movements similar to having sex. Comedy Central apologised for the broadcast, blaming it on an "unintentional genuine error".

The network appealed the ban in the Delhi High Court, but a single judge bench upheld the ban stating that the penalty prohibiting the broadcast of the channel for 10 days could not be considered as "excessive, harsh or unreasonable''".

Viewers were presented with a simple black screen for the duration of the ban. The ministry's decision to directly issue a show-cause notice and, later, order a blackout raised serious concern in the Indian broadcasting industry. Most reactions on social media saw the government's move as "extreme and draconian". Critics felt that the government had used the vague framing of the Constitution to censor Internet material, threatening India's democratic traditions.

See also 
Comedy Central

References

External links
 Viacom18
 

Comedy Central
Television channels and stations established in 2012
Television stations in Mumbai
Comedy television channels in India
English-language television stations in India
Viacom 18
2012 establishments in Maharashtra